Glyphaea tomentosa is a species of flowering plant in the family Malvaceae sensu lato, or Tiliaceae or Sparrmanniaceae family.
It is found only in Mozambique.

References

Grewioideae
Data deficient plants
Endemic flora of Mozambique
Taxonomy articles created by Polbot